The following is a list of episodes for the British drama Lewis that first aired in 2006. As of 10 November 2015, 33 episodes have aired.

Overview

Episodes

Series 1 (2006–07)

Series 2 (2008)

Series 3 (2009)

Series 4 (2010)

Series 5 (2011)

Series 6 (2012)

Series 7 (2013)
This series consists of three stories, each divided into two parts in the UK.  In Australia, Belgium, The Netherlands, Germany and the United States, the stories were not divided, rather each shown as an entire piece. (Repeat showings in the UK, on ITV3, were similarly complete.)

Series 8 (2014)
This series again consists of three stories, each divided into two parts in the UK. In Belgium and the United States, the stories were not divided, rather each is shown as an entire piece. (Repeat showings in the UK, on ITV3, were similarly complete.)

Series 9 (2015)

The final series consists of three stories, each divided into two parts in the UK. In the United States, the stories were not divided; rather, each was shown as an entire piece.

Notes

A.  Episodes 1, 2, 4 and 6 are based on 28 day data from BARB for ITV and ITV+1 and 7 day data for ITV HD. Episodes 3 and 5 are based on 28 day data from BARB for ITV and ITV+1.

References

External links
 List of Lewis episodes at the Internet Movie Database
 Inspector Lewis pilot at PBS
 Inspector Lewis episodes at PBS

Lists of British drama television series episodes
Lists of British crime television series episodes
List of episodes
Lewis